Governor Dickerson may refer to:

Denver S. Dickerson (1872–1925), 11th Governor of Nevada
Mahlon Dickerson (1770–1853), 7th Governor of New Jersey
Philemon Dickerson (1788–1862), 12th Governor of New Jersey